Damian Gaviola Mercado is a Filipino politician from the province of Southern Leyte in the Philippines. He currently serves as a Governor of Southern Leyte. He was first elected as Governor of the province in 2016 and was re-elected in 2019.

References

External links
Province of Southern Leyte Official Website

|-

|-

Living people
Governors of Southern Leyte
PDP–Laban politicians
1954 births